Peter I or Peter Frederick Louis of Holstein-Gottorp (17 January 1755 – 21 May 1829) was the Regent of the Duchy of Oldenburg for his incapacitated cousin William I from 1785 to 1823, and then served himself as Duke from 1823 to 1829.

He also served from 1785 to 1803 as the last Lutheran Prince-Bishop of Lübeck, until that Prince-Bishopric was secularized and joined to Oldenburg.  His son, Augustus, was the first Duke of Oldenburg to use the style of Grand Duke that was granted in 1815.

Early life
Peter Frederick Louis was born on 17 January 1755 at Riesenburg, Prussia. He was the only surviving son of Prince Georg Ludwig of Holstein-Gottorp and Sophie Charlotte of Schleswig-Holstein-Sonderburg-Beck.

Marriage and issue

On 6 June 1781, he married Duchess Frederica of Württemberg, the second daughter of Frederick II Eugene, Duke of Württemberg and his wife, Friederike Dorothea of Brandenburg-Schwedt. Frederica's sister, Sophie, was the wife of Crown Prince Paul of Russia (the future Tsar Paul I. Peter and Frederica became the parents of two sons: August (born in 1783) and George (born in 1784).

Fredericka died due to complications from a miscarriage on 24 November 1785 at Vienna, Austria, predeceasing her husband by forty years.

Later life and succession
He was appointed Regent of the Duchy of Oldenburg for his incapacitated cousin Peter Frederick William in 1785.

From 1785 until 1803, he also served as the last Lutheran Prince-Bishop of Lübeck, until that Prince-Bishopric was secularized as the Principality of Lübeck and joined to Oldenburg.

Following the death of Wilhelm in 1823, he himself became reigning Duke of Oldenburg. Although the Duchy of Oldenburg had been elevated to a Grand Duchy in 1815, he refrained from using the title of Grand Duke. His son, Augustus, was the first Duke of Oldenburg to use the style of Grand Duke.

Peter I died on 21 May 1829 in Wiesbaden. He was buried in the Ducal Mausoleum in the Churchyard of Saint Gertrude in Oldenburg.

He was succeeded as Grand Duke of Oldenburg by his eldest son, Paul Friedrich August, the first of the House of Holstein-Gottorp to use the elevated style.

Ancestry

References

External links

1755 births
1829 deaths
Dukes of Oldenburg
Grand Dukes of Oldenburg
Lutheran Prince-Bishops of Lübeck
House of Holstein-Gottorp
People from Ammerland
People from Kwidzyn County
People from East Prussia
Burials at the Ducal Mausoleum, Gertrudenfriedhof (Oldenburg)